Amaryllidoideae (Amaryllidaceae s.s., amaryllids) is a subfamily of monocot flowering plants in the family Amaryllidaceae, order Asparagales. The subfamily includes about seventy genera, with over eight hundred species, and a worldwide distribution.

The Amaryllidoideae subfamily includes about 70 genera.

Genera

 Acis Salisb.
 Amaryllis L.
 Ammocharis Herb. (including Cybistetes Milne-Redh. & Schweick.)
 Apodolirion Baker
 Boophone Herb.
 Brunsvigia Heist.
 Caliphruria Herb. – synonym of Urceolina Reichenbach
 Calostemma R.Br.
 Chlidanthus Herb. (including Castellanoa Traub)
 Clinanthus Herb. (syn. Anax Ravenna)
 Clivia Lindl.
 Crinum L.
 Crossyne Salisb.
 Cryptostephanus Welw. ex Baker
 Cyrtanthus Aiton (syns Anoiganthus Baker, Vallota Salisb. ex Herb.)
 Eucharis Planch. & Linden, syn. of Urceolina Reichenbach
 Eucrosia Ker Gawl. (syn. Callipsyche Herb.)
 Eustephia Cav.
 Galanthus L.
 Gethyllis L. (syn. Klingia Schönl.)
 Griffinia Ker Gawl. (including Hyline Herb.)
 Haemanthus L.
 Hannonia Braun-Blanq. & Maire
 Hessea Herb. (syn. Kamiesbergia Snijman)
 Hieronymiella Pax (syn. Eustephiopsis R.E.Fr.)
 Hippeastrum Herb. (syn. Moldenkea Traub)
 Hymenocallis Salisb.
 Ismene Salisb. ex Herb (including Elisena Herb. and Pseudostenomesson Velarde)
 Lapiedra Lag.
 Leptochiton Sealy
 Leucojum L.
 Lycoris Herb.
 Mathieua Klotzsch
 Namaquanula D.Müll.-Doblies & U.Müll.-Doblies
 Narcissus L. (including Braxireon Raf. and Tapeinanthus Herb.)
 Nerine Herb.
 Pamianthe Stapf
 Pancratium L. (syns Mizonia A.Chev., Chapmanolirion Dinter)
 Paposoa Nic.García (syn. Eremolirion Nic.García)
 Paramongaia Velarde
 Phaedranassa Herb. (syns Neostricklandia Rauschert, Stricklandia Baker)
 Phycella Lyndl. (including Famatina Ravenna, Placea Miers)
 Plagiolirion Baker
 Proiphys Herb. (syn. Eurycles Salisb. ex Schult. & Schult.)
 Pyrolirion Herb.
 Rauhia Traub
 Scadoxus Raf. (syn. Choananthus Rendle)
 Shoubiaonia W.H.Qin
 Sprekelia Heist.
 Stenomesson Herb. (syn. Anax (plant)|Anax Ravenna, Callithauma Herb., Crocopsis Pax, Pucara Ravenna)
 Sternbergia Waldst. & Kit.
 Strumaria Jacq. ex Willd. (syns Bokkeveldia D.Müll.-Doblies & U.Müll.-Doblies, Carpolyza Salisb., Gemmaria Salisb., Carpolyza Salisb., Tedingea D.Müll.-Doblies & U.Müll.-Doblies)
 Traubia Moldenke
 Ungernia Bunge
 Urceolina Rchb. (syns Collania Schult. & Schult.f., Pseudourceolina Vargas)
 Vagaria Herb.
 Worsleya  (W.Watson ex Traub) Traub
 Zephyranthes Herb. (syns. Cooperia Herb., Eithea Ravenna, Habranthus Herb., Rhodophiala C.Presl, Rhodolirium Phil.,  Rhodolirion Dalla Torre & Harms, Zephyranthella (Pax) Pax, Haylockia Herb.)

References

Bibliography 

 

Taxonomic lists (genera)
 
Lists of plant genera (alphabetic)